London Fire and Civil Defence Authority (LFCDA) was the fire authority of Greater London from 1 April 1986 to 3 July 2000.

It replaced the Greater London Council as fire authority when it was abolished.

The LFCDA was a joint authority, made up of councillors appointed by the London borough councils.

The LFCDA was replaced by the London Fire and Emergency Planning Authority, a functional body of the Greater London Authority.

References

Greater London Council replacement organisations
2000 disestablishments in England
1986 establishments in England